The Butterfly Banty, also called the Kimbrel Banty for its designer, is an American homebuilt ultralight aircraft that was designed by Mike Kimbrel and produced by Butterfly Aero of Oakville, Washington, introduced in 1984. The aircraft was supplied in the form of plans for amateur construction.

Design and development
It features a strut-braced parasol wing, a single-seat open cockpit with a windshield, fixed conventional landing gear and a single engine in tractor configuration.

The aircraft is made from wood with its flying surfaces covered doped aircraft fabric. The wings are supported by "V" struts with jury struts and can be folded for ground transport or storage.

The plans included detailed parts drawings, a materials list and construction instructions intended to assist inexperienced builders. The designer estimates the construction time from the supplied plans as 500 hours.

Operational history
By 1998, the company reported that 1820 sets of plans had been sold and 30 aircraft were flying.

Specifications (Banty)

References

External links
Photo of a Banty
Photo of a Banty in flight

Banty
1980s United States sport aircraft
1980s United States ultralight aircraft
Single-engined tractor aircraft
Parasol-wing aircraft
Homebuilt aircraft